Mànran is a 2011 album, the debut LP by Scottish Celtic rock band Mànran. It includes their download single "Latha Math".

It won the award for "Album of the Year" at the 2011 Scots Trad Music Awards.

Track listing

 Fingal's Cave - 3:00  	  	
 Reels - 3:33 	 	
 Glaodh an Iar - 3:51 	 	
 Oran na Cloiche - 3:05 	 	
 Speybay Switch - 5:56 	 	
 Maraiche nan Aigh - 4:45 		
 The Open Door - 3:47 		
 Latha Math - 3:31 	 	
 Scottische - 5:04 		
 An Eala Bhàn - 4:49 	 	
 Chasing Daylight - 3:11 	 	
 Puirt - 3:34

Personnel
Scott MacKay: drums, percussion
Norrie MacIver: lead vocals
Gary Innes:  accordion keyboard
Calum Stewart: flute, small pipes
Ewen Henderson: bagpipes, fiddle
Ross Saunders: bass

Additional musicians
Phil Cunningham

2011 albums
Mànran albums